Dinge is a city and commune of Angola, located in the province of Cabinda.

See also 

 Communes of Angola

References 

Provincial capitals in Angola
Populated places in Cabinda Province
Port cities and towns in Angola
Municipalities of Angola